Walter Seiler (born 15 May 1954, in Wettingen) is a retired Swiss footballer who played as a forward.

Honours

 1980–81 Nationalliga A
 1984-85 Swiss Cup

External links
 
 

1954 births
Living people
Swiss men's footballers
Association football forwards
FC Wettingen players
Grasshopper Club Zürich players
FC Lausanne-Sport players
FC Zürich players
FC Aarau players
Switzerland international footballers